Clifford Hiram Knox (January 7, 1902 – September 24, 1965) was a professional baseball player. Nicknamed "Bud", he was a catcher for one season (1924) with the Pittsburgh Pirates.  For his career, he compiled a .222 batting average in 18 at-bats, with two runs batted in.

He was born in Coalville, Iowa and died in Oskaloosa, Iowa at the age of 63.

External links

1902 births
1965 deaths
Pittsburgh Pirates players
Major League Baseball catchers
Baseball players from Iowa
Des Moines Boosters players
Birmingham Barons players
Hartford Senators players
Waco Cubs players
Nashville Vols players
Peoria Tractors players
Omaha Packers players
Rock Island Islanders players
Decatur Commodores players
People from Webster County, Iowa
People from Oskaloosa, Iowa